Hugh E. "Ted" Price is a former Deputy Director for Operations of the U.S. Central Intelligence Agency and is currently chairman of Lehman Brothers India.

Price graduated from Yale before serving four years in the United States Marine Corps.  While with the CIA he held the positions of Director of Personnel, Director of Counterintelligence, as well as Deputy Director for Operations.  In 1994, he received a letter of reprimand over his role in the Aldrich Ames spy case while director of counterintelligence.

After leaving the Central Intelligence Agency, Price joined the private security business Kroll Inc. as head of its crisis management group.  He joined Lehman Brothers in December 2001 as head of Global Security.

In 2005 Price married Lisa Spiro, former communications head at Salomon Brothers and UBS.

References

People of the Central Intelligence Agency
Living people
Year of birth missing (living people)